Ann Vickers is a 1933 American pre-Code romantic drama directed by John Cromwell and starring Irene Dunne and Walter Huston. It is based on the novel of the same name by Sinclair Lewis.

Plot
After a military officer (Bruce Cabot) gets Ann Vickers (Irene Dunne) pregnant and leaves her, she and friend Malvina Wormser (Edna May Oliver) go to Havana, where she gives birth, though the child dies soon after.  Feeling conflicted and regretful, Ann devotes herself to social work, taking a job in a women's prison. However, when she tries to improve the conditions there, she loses her job. She instead writes a book about the harsh realities of the prison and begins a romance with a married judge, Barney Dolphin (Walter Huston). Though progressive in his views, Dolphin is caught taking bribes and is sentenced to prison.  Ann, once again pregnant, supports herself by writing until Dolphin is released a few years later.  Finally, Ann, Dolphin, and their child are reunited.

Cast
Irene Dunne as Ann Vickers
Walter Huston as Barney Dolphin
Conrad Nagel as Lindsey Atwell
Bruce Cabot as Captain Resnick
Edna May Oliver as Malvina Wormser
Sam Hardy as Russell Spaulding
Mitchell Lewis as Captain Waldo
Murray Kinnell as Dr. Slenk
Helen Eby-Rock as Kitty Cognac
Gertrude Michael as Mona Dolphin
J. Carroll Naish as Dr. Sorelle 
Sarah Padden as Lil 
Reginald Barlow as Chaplain
Rafaella Ottiano as Mrs. Feldermans
Wally Albright as Mischa Feldermans (uncredited) 
John Cromwell as Sad-Faced Doughboy (uncredited)

Controversy
In the novel, Ann Vickers is a birth control advocate and reformer who has two extramarital affairs, each time becoming pregnant though unwed. The original screenplay, following Sinclair Lewis's novel, had her obtaining an abortion, but the story was changed so that she gives birth to a child who dies.  The screenplay for the 1933 film was approved by the Production Code only when RKO Radio Pictures also agreed to make Vickers an unmarried woman at the time of her affairs, thus eliminating the issue of adultery.

The reaction of leading American Roman Catholics to the content in this film and The Sign of the Cross led to the formation in 1934 of the Catholic Legion of Decency, an organization dedicated to identifying and combating what it viewed as objectionable content in films, usually by threatening a boycott.

Footnotes

References
Hopwood, Jon C. IMDb. John Cromwell: Biography. https://www.imdb.com/name/nm0188669/bio?ref_=nm_sa_1  Retrieved August 9, 2020.

External links

American romantic drama films
American black-and-white films
Films based on American novels
Films based on works by Sinclair Lewis
Films directed by John Cromwell
RKO Pictures films
1933 romantic drama films
Films with screenplays by Jane Murfin
1933 films
1930s American films
1930s feminist films